Luoyang Subway is a metro network serving urban and suburban districts of Luoyang. It is the second metro system in Henan Province, as well as the first metro system in a city that is not a provincial capital in central and western China.

Lines

Line 1

Line 1 is a west–east line from Hongshan station to Yangwan station. It began construction in June 2017. It was opened on 28 March 2021.

Line 2

Line 2 is a north–south line from Erqiao Road station to Balitang station. It began construction in December 2017. It connects both Luoyang railway station and Luoyang Longmen railway station. The line opened on December 26, 2021.

History
The first phase of the system, including Line 1 and the first phase of Line 2, was approved by the National Development and Reform Commission in August 2016.

Construction of Line 1 started on 28 June 2017, and Line 2 on 26 December 2017.

Network map

References

Rapid transit in China
Rail transport in Henan
Railway lines opened in 2021
2021 establishments in China
 
Luoyang